7 is the sixth studio album by Polish rapper O.S.T.R., released on 24 February 2006 on Asfalt Records. It was nominated for a Fryderyk award in 2006 in the "Album of the Year Club Music" category. It charted #2 on Billboard "Hit of the World" for Poland.

Track listing

References

2006 albums
O.S.T.R. albums
Polish-language albums